Westfield Valencia Town Center, formerly Valencia Town Center, is a shopping mall in the neighborhood of Valencia in Santa Clarita, California. Westfield Group first acquired a quarter-interest in the property in 2002 and a further quarter-interest in 2005, thereafter assuming management control. The mall was then renamed Westfield Valencia Town Center.

Anchor stores include Macy's (first opened as May Company, later became Robinsons-May in 1993 until Macy's in 2006), JCPenney, Forever 21, Regal Cinemas, H&M, and Gold's Gym with one vacant anchor last occupied by Sears, which closed on March 18, 2018.

In 2019, Westfield Valencia Town Center proposed a new “The Patios Connection” project at the former Sears site, which would include a luxury cinema, gym, Costco, and gas station. The proposed Costco would include a 275-space, rooftop parking lot. In April 2021, the project was canceled.

Gallery

References

External links
Westfield Valencia official website

Valencia Town Center
Shopping malls in Los Angeles County, California
Santa Clarita, California
Shopping malls established in 1992